Wade Manson Baldwin IV (born March 29, 1996) is an American professional basketball player for Maccabi Tel Aviv of the Israeli Basketball Premier League and the EuroLeague.

High school and college career
Born in the Belle Mead section of Montgomery Township, New Jersey, Baldwin attended Immaculata High School in Somerville, New Jersey and transferred to St. Joseph High School in Metuchen, New Jersey prior to his junior year.

As a freshman at Vanderbilt, Baldwin started 24 of 35 games and averaged 9.3 points, 4.1 rebounds, 1.4 steals (8th in the SEC), and 4.4 assists per game (5th), while shooting 43.9% from three-point range. He set a Vanderbilt freshman record with 155 assists.

During his sophomore year, he averaged 14.1 points, 4 rebounds, and 5.2 assists (3rd in the SEC) per game, while shooting 40.6% from three-point range and .799 from the line (9th). Baldwin led Vanderbilt to an appearance in the First Four in 2016 where they lost to Wichita State, 70–50.

On March 28, 2016, Baldwin declared for the NBA draft, forgoing his final two years of college eligibility.

Professional career

Memphis Grizzlies (2016–2017)
On June 23, 2016, Baldwin was selected by the Memphis Grizzlies with the 17th overall pick in the 2016 NBA draft. On July 16, 2016, he signed his rookie scale contract with the Grizzlies. He made his debut for the Grizzlies in their season opener on October 26, 2016, recording seven points, five rebounds, six assists, three steals and three blocks in 24 minutes off the bench in a 102–98 win over the Minnesota Timberwolves. On December 6, 2016, he recorded his first double-digit-scoring game with 11 points in the Grizzlies' 96–91 win over the Philadelphia 76ers. During his rookie season, Baldwin had multiple assignments with the Iowa Energy, the Grizzlies' D-League affiliate. On October 16, 2017, Baldwin was waived by the Grizzlies.

Portland Trail Blazers (2017–2019)
On October 19, 2017, Baldwin was signed on a two-way contract by the Portland Trail Blazers. Under the terms of the deal, for the 2017–18 season, he had a one-year deal splitting time between the Trail Blazers and a G-League affiliate that would be best suited for him, since Portland is currently one of four teams to not hold a G-League affiliate of their own this season. In this instance, he would be spending time with the Texas Legends. On March 12, 2018, Baldwin signed a standard NBA contract with the Blazers.

On February 4, 2019, Baldwin was traded to the Cleveland Cavaliers along with Nik Stauskas and two second-round picks for Rodney Hood.

On February 7, the Cleveland Cavaliers then traded both him and Stauskas to the Houston Rockets. Hours later, he was traded again, this time to the Indiana Pacers alongside Stauskas, a 2021 second-round draft pick and the rights to Maarty Leunen, in exchange for cash considerations. On February 8, 2019, Baldwin was waived by the Pacers.

Raptors 905 (2019)
On February 25, 2019, Baldwin was claimed off waivers by the Raptors 905.

Olympiacos (2019–2020)
On July 17, 2019, Baldwin signed a two-year contract with the Greek EuroLeague club Olympiacos.

Bayern Munich (2020–2021)
On July 27, 2020, he signed with Bayern Munich of the Basketball Bundesliga (BBL).

Baskonia (2021–2022)
On July 10, 2021, he signed with Saski Baskonia of the Liga ACB. He averaged 14.1 points, 3.6 rebounds, 4.4 assists, and 1.1 steals per game.

Maccabi Tel Aviv (2022–present)

On June 30, 2022, Baldwin signed a two-year contract with Maccabi Tel Aviv of the Israeli Premier League and the EuroLeague.

Career statistics

NBA

Regular season

|-
| style="text-align:left;"| 
| style="text-align:left;"| Memphis
| 33 || 1 || 12.3 || .313 || .136 || .838 || 1.4 || 1.8 || .5 || .2 || 3.2
|-
| style="text-align:left;"| 
| style="text-align:left;"| Portland
| 7 || 0 || 11.4 || .667 || .800 || .600 || 1.1 || .7 || .3 || .1 || 5.4
|-
| style="text-align:left;"| 
| style="text-align:left;"| Portland
| 16 || 0 || 5.9 || .303 || .222 || .727 || .9 || .8 || .1 || .1 || 1.9
|- class="sortbottom"
| style="text-align:center;" colspan="2"| Career
| 56 || 1 || 10.3 || .355 || .250 || .776 || 1.2 || 1.4 || .4 || .2 || 3.1

Playoffs

|-
| style="text-align:left;"| 2017
| style="text-align:left;"| Memphis
| 3 || 0 || 4.0 || .000 || .000 || 1.000 || 1.3 || .7 || .0 || .0 || 0.7
|-
| style="text-align:left;"| 2018
| style="text-align:left;"| Portland
| 4 || 0 || 4.8 || .250 || 1.000 || .500 || .8 || .8 || .3 || .3 || 1.0
|- class="sortbottom"
| style="text-align:center;" colspan="2"| Career
| 7 || 0 || 4.4 || .200 || 1.000 || .750 || 1.0 || .7 || .1 || .1 || 0.9

EuroLeague

|-
| style="text-align:left;"| 2019–20
| style="text-align:left;"| Olympiacos
| 24 || 9 || 16.4 || .481 || .267 || .633 || 1.8 || 1.8 || .5 || .0 || 5.5 || 4.3
|-
| style="text-align:left;"| 2020–21
| style="text-align:left;"| Bayern
| 39 || 38 || 27.1 || .488 || .285 || .761 || 3.0 || 4.0 || 1.1 || .3 || 15.3 || 13.4

References

External links
 Career statistics and player information from NBA.com, or Basketball-Reference.com
 Euroleague.net profile
 Eurobasket.com profile
 Vanderbilt Commodores bio

1996 births
Living people
African-American basketball players
American men's basketball players
American expatriate basketball people in Germany
American expatriate basketball people in Greece
American expatriate basketball people in Israel
American expatriate basketball people in Spain
Basketball players from New Jersey
FC Bayern Munich basketball players
Houston Rockets players
Immaculata High School (New Jersey) alumni
Iowa Energy players
Maccabi Tel Aviv B.C. players
Memphis Grizzlies draft picks
Memphis Grizzlies players
Olympiacos B.C. players
People from Montgomery Township, New Jersey
Point guards
Portland Trail Blazers players
Raptors 905 players
Saski Baskonia players
Shooting guards
Sportspeople from Somerset County, New Jersey
St. Joseph High School (Metuchen, New Jersey) alumni
Texas Legends players
Vanderbilt Commodores men's basketball players